Derrick Lamar Henry Jr. (born January 4, 1994) is an American football running back for the Tennessee Titans of the National Football League (NFL). His imposing rushing game and larger stature than the average running back earned him the nickname  "King Henry".

Born and raised in Yulee, Florida, Henry set the national high school football record for career rushing yards with the Yulee Hornets. He played college football at Alabama, where during his junior season, he broke Herschel Walker's single-season college rushing yards record in the Southeastern Conference (SEC), won the 2015 Heisman Trophy, the Doak Walker Award, the Maxwell Award, and the Walter Camp Award, and was a key part of the 2015 Alabama Crimson Tide football team that won the 2016 College Football Playoff National Championship.

Henry was drafted in the second round of the 2016 NFL draft by the Titans. He led the NFL in rushing yards for the 2019 season, as well as rushing touchdowns (tied with Green Bay Packers running back Aaron Jones). In 2020, Henry would again lead the league in rushing yards and touchdowns and became the eighth player in NFL history to rush for over 2,000 yards in a single season, and the second Tennessee Titan to do so. Henry won the 2020 Associated Press NFL Offensive Player of the Year Award.

Early life
Derrick Lamar Henry Jr. was born in Yulee, Florida, a suburb of Jacksonville, to Stacy Veal and Derrick Henry Sr., aged 15 and 16 respectively. Henry's father, known as "Big D", was absent for much of his childhood, having been arrested 20 times for various crimes including drug and prostitution-related offenses, and was consequently in and out of prison and had trouble maintaining employment. His mother became a hemodialysis technician. Henry was raised primarily by his grandmother, Gladys, who nicknamed him "Shocka", as his birth shocked the whole family, given his parents' young ages. He developed a close relationship to his grandmother, whom he cites as very influential in his upbringing.

High school career
Henry attended Yulee High School, where he was a three-sport star in football, basketball, and track. He played as a running back for the Yulee Hornets football team. He ran for 2,465 yards and 26 touchdowns as a freshman in 2009. He was named a first-team All-Coast selection at running back in 2010 after rushing for 2,788 yards and 38 touchdowns while averaging 8.9 yards per attempt. He rushed for 2,610 yards and 34 scores as a junior in 2011 to earn first-team All-Coast honors from the Florida Times-Union. He set the Florida high school record with a 510-yard performance against Jacksonville Jackson (a record he held until 2021) and averaged 9.2 yards per carry and 327.8 yards per game as a senior, finishing the season with a state-record 4,261 yards and 55 touchdowns. He finished his high school football career with 12,124 career rushing yards, which broke Ken Hall's career record. He also rushed for 153 career touchdowns. His career touchdown totals rank fifth all-time. In four years at Yulee he averaged more than 250 yards a game and never rushed for fewer than 100 yards in a game. He played for the East squad in the 2013 U.S. Army All-American Bowl, where he rushed for 53 yards with a touchdown and a two-point conversion.

As a track & field athlete, Henry competed as a sprinter at Yulee from 2010 to 2011. He posted a personal-best time of 11.11 seconds in the 100-meter dash at the 2011 FHSAA 2A District 3 Championships, where he placed seventh. He was also a member of the 4×100 and 4×400 squads.

Considered a five-star recruit by ESPN.com, Henry was listed as the No. 1 athlete (player with no designated position) in the nation in 2013. After originally committing to the University of Georgia, Henry committed to the University of Alabama on September 28, 2012. He held offers from many of the top college football programs in the country, including USC, Notre Dame, Tennessee, Florida, and Clemson. His number was eventually retired by Yulee.

High school statistics

College career
Henry attended and played college football for the University of Alabama from 2013 to 2015 under head coach Nick Saban. He majored in communication. He graduated on May 4, 2018. That same day, he published an article in The Players' Tribune thanking his late grandmother for the inspiration to continue pursuing his degree.

2013 season

As a true freshman in 2013, Henry rushed for 382 yards on 36 carries with three touchdowns in a backfield largely dominated by T. J. Yeldon and Kenyan Drake. On October 19, against Arkansas, he had 111 rushing yards and his first collegiate rushing touchdown in the 52–0 victory. During the 2014 Sugar Bowl, he rushed for 100 yards and a touchdown on eight carries and had a 61-yard touchdown reception in the 45–31 loss to the Oklahoma Sooners. In that game, Spanish-language broadcaster Pablo Viruega on ESPN Deportes nicknamed him "El Tractorcito" (The Little Tractor) due to his long stride and powerful gait. The nickname became a popular internet meme.

2014 season

In the 2014 season, Henry and Yeldon split a majority of the work in the backfield. In the season opener against West Virginia, he had 113 rushing yards and a rushing touchdown in the 33–23 victory in the Chick-fil-A Kickoff Game. On September 20, against Florida, he had 111 rushing yards and a rushing touchdown in the 42–21 victory. On October 18 against Texas A&M, he had 70 rushing yards, one rushing touchdown, and a 41-yard receiving touchdown in the 59–0 victory.  On November 22, against Western Carolina, he had 92 rushing yards, two rushing touchdowns, and a nine-yard receiving touchdown in the 48–14 victory. In the annual rivalry game against Auburn, he had 72 rushing yards and a touchdown in the high-scoring 55–44 installment of the rivalry. In the SEC Championship against Missouri, he had 141 rushing yards and two rushing touchdowns in the 42–13 victory. Alabama qualified for the College Football Playoff and faced off against Ohio State in the National Semifinals in the Sugar Bowl. Henry had 95 rushing yards, one rushing touchdown, and two receptions for 54 yards as Alabama fell 42–35 to the Buckeyes. In his sophomore year, Henry rushed for 990 yards on 172 carries with 11 touchdowns.

2015 season: National Championship and Heisman season

After Yeldon left for the NFL, Henry took over as the starting running back as a junior in 2015. In the season opener against Wisconsin, he had 147 rushing yards and three rushing touchdowns in the 35–17 victory. In the next game, against Middle Tennessee State, he had 96 rushing yards and another game with three rushing touchdowns in the 37–10 victory. In the next game against Ole Miss, he had 127 rushing yards, one rushing touchdown, and five receptions for 39 yards in Alabama's only loss of the season, a 43–37 decision. After rushing for 52 yards against Louisiana–Monroe, he had 148 rushing yards and a touchdown in a 38–10 victory over previously undefeated Georgia. On October 10, he rushed for 95 yards and a touchdown against Arkansas in a 27–14 victory. After the victory over the Razorbacks, he went on an impressive stretch of performances. On October 17, against Texas A&M, he had 236 rushing yards, two rushing touchdowns, and an 18-yard reception in a 41–23 victory. In the next game, a narrow 19–14 victory over Tennessee, he had 143 rushing yards and two rushing touchdowns. In the following game, a much-anticipated matchup with fellow Heisman contender Leonard Fournette of LSU, he had 210 rushing yards and three rushing touchdowns in the 30–16 victory over the previously undefeated team. In the next game, against Mississippi State, he had 204 rushing yards and two rushing touchdowns in the 31–6 victory. In the next game, against Charleston Southern, he had 68 rushing yards and two more rushing touchdowns in a limited role in the 56–6 victory. In the Iron Bowl against Auburn, he had 271 rushing yards and a rushing touchdown on 46 carries in the 29–13 victory. In the SEC Championship against Florida, he had 44 carries for 189 yards and a touchdown in the 29–15 victory. Alabama qualified for the College Football Playoff and faced off against Michigan State in the National Semifinals. In the 38–0 victory over the Spartans in the Cotton Bowl, he had 75 rushing yards and two rushing touchdowns. During Alabama's 45–40 victory over Clemson in the 2016 College Football Playoff National Championship, he rushed for 158 yards on 36 carries with three touchdowns. During the game, he also broke Shaun Alexander's record for most career rushing yards in Alabama history. Playing in all 15 games, he rushed for SEC records 2,219 yards and 28 touchdowns on 395 carries. In addition, he scored at least one touchdown in each game. He led the NCAA in rushing attempts, rushing yards, rushing touchdowns, and points scored. Henry won the Heisman Trophy, beating out finalists Christian McCaffrey and Deshaun Watson. He won numerous other awards including the Doak Walker Award, Walter Camp Award, and Maxwell Award. Henry declared for the 2016 NFL Draft after his junior season.

College statistics

Professional career
Coming out of Alabama, Henry was projected by the majority of analysts to be either drafted in the late first or second round. Scouts regarded his main assets to be his large frame, violent running, ability to break tackles with ease, speed, long strides, superior conditioning, and consistent play. The main concerns were about the wear and tear his body took as a workhorse at Alabama, his slow acceleration, average foot quickness, below-average catching ability, narrow based running style, sluggish cutbacks, and running tall.

Henry was drafted by the Tennessee Titans in the second round (45th overall) of the 2016 NFL Draft. He was the second running back taken that year, after #4 Ezekiel Elliott. He was reunited with his former fullback at Alabama Jalston Fowler.

2016–2017: Backup years

On May 9, 2016, the Tennessee Titans signed Henry to a four-year, $5.40 million contract with $3.30 million guaranteed and a signing bonus of $2.13 million.

Henry began his rookie season as the backup running back to veteran DeMarco Murray. He wore the No. 2 jersey throughout training camp and preseason and donned the No. 22 once running back Dexter McCluster was cut on September 2, 2016.

Henry made his NFL debut and earned his first NFL start in the Titans' season-opening loss to the Minnesota Vikings. He finished the game with five carries for three yards and two receptions for 41 yards. During Week 8, Henry scored his first NFL touchdown on a 6-yard rush in a 36–22 victory over the Jacksonville Jaguars. He finished the game with 16 carries for a then career-high 60 rushing yards and a rushing touchdown and four catches for 37 yards. On December 18, 2016, he had nine rushing attempts for 58 rushing yards and a season-high two rushing touchdowns in a 19–17 road victory over the Kansas City Chiefs. During the season finale against the Houston Texans, he ran for a then-career-high 65 rushing yards on 15 carries and scored a touchdown in the 24–17 victory.

Henry finished his rookie season with 110 carries for 490 yards (both sixth among NFL rookies in 2016) and five touchdowns in 15 games and two starts. He also caught 13 passes for 137 yards.

For most of the 2017 season, Henry split carries with DeMarco Murray and run-oriented quarterback Marcus Mariota. During Week 2, Henry ran for 92 yards and a touchdown on 14 carries in a 37–16 road victory against the Jacksonville Jaguars. On October 16, 2017, on Monday Night Football, Henry ran for a then career-best 131 yards on 19 carries, including a 72-yard touchdown late in the fourth quarter of the 36–22 victory over the Indianapolis Colts. In addition, he had a 14-yard reception in the victory. During Week 13, Henry ran for 109 yards on 11 carries and beat his longest rush of the year with a 75-yard rushing touchdown late in the fourth quarter of the 24–13 victory over the Houston Texans. In the regular season finale against the Jaguars, Henry caught his first receiving touchdown on a 66-yard reception from Marcus Mariota in the 15–10 victory.

The Titans finished second in the AFC South with a 9–7 record and made the playoffs as a Wild Card team. In the Wild Card Round, the Titans played the Kansas City Chiefs. Because DeMarco Murray was out with a knee injury, Henry got the start. In a 22–21 road victory, Henry had the best performance of his career up to that point, rushing for 156 yards and a touchdown on 23 carries and catching two passes for 35 yards. His 191 yards-from-scrimmage was a franchise record. In the Divisional Round against the New England Patriots, Henry had 28 rushing yards and 21 receiving yards in the 35–14 road loss.

Henry finished the regular season with 176 carries for 744 rushing yards and five touchdowns in 15 games and two starts. He also caught 11 passes for 136 yards and a touchdown. In the postseason, Henry ran for 184 yards and a touchdown on 35 carries and caught five passes for 56 yards.

2018: Transition to starter

During the 2018 offseason, Matt LaFleur was hired as the Titans' new offensive coordinator and the team also acquired running back Dion Lewis. Lewis' pass-catching ability was seen as a fit for LaFleur's offensive scheme, which often employed running backs to catch passes out of the backfield, and leading to success with Todd Gurley in the previous season as offensive coordinator with the Rams. This led to speculation that LaFleur would favor Lewis over Henry.

Henry ended up splitting carries with Lewis and run-oriented quarterback Marcus Mariota for most of the 2018 season. During Week 2, Henry recorded an eight-yard pass completion, the first of his career, to wide receiver Taywan Taylor in the Titans' 20–17 victory over the Houston Texans. He also had 18 carries in that game and the next against the Jacksonville Jaguars, but was used much less frequently through the middle of the season.

From Weeks 4–13, Henry averaged nine carries for only 37 yards per game, and never rushed for over 60 yards. This all changed in Week 14 against the Jaguars. In the second quarter, Henry had a 99-yard touchdown run, fending off three tacklers, tying him with Tony Dorsett for the longest NFL touchdown run. He finished the game with four rushing touchdowns and 238 rushing yards on 17 carries, breaking Chris Johnson's franchise record of 228 yards in 2009. He also became the ninth player in NFL history to record a 200+ yard and 4+ touchdown game, and the first to do so on fewer than 22 carries. His 238 rushing yards were the most by any player for a single game for the 2018 season. Henry was named the AFC Offensive Player of the Week due to his spectacular performance. During Week 15, the Titans went on the road to face the New York Giants. In a cold and rainy game, Henry led the NFL in rushing for the second consecutive week with 170 yards and two touchdowns on a career-high 33 carries, along with a one-yard reception and six-yard pass completion in the 17–0 shutout. In Weeks 16 and 17, he combined for 177 rushing yards and a touchdown in the two games against the Washington Redskins and Indianapolis Colts. He was later named the AFC Offensive Player of the Month for December.

Henry finished the 2018 season with 1,059 rushing yards and 12 touchdowns along with 15 receptions for 99 yards. After the season, he was ranked 99th on the NFL Top 100 Players of 2019.

2019: First Rushing title, Pro Bowl selection

In the 2019 season opener against the Cleveland Browns, Henry rushed 19 times for 84 yards and a touchdown. He also caught one pass for a 75-yard touchdown as the Titans won on the road 43–13. During Week 2 against the Indianapolis Colts, he rushed 15 times for 81 yards and a touchdown as the Titans narrowly lost 19–17. Two weeks later against the Atlanta Falcons, Henry had his first 100-yard game of the season when he rushed for 100 yards on 27 carries in a 24–10 road victory. In the next game against the Buffalo Bills, he rushed for 78 yards and a touchdown as the Titans lost by a score of 14–7. After a season-low 28 yards in a Week 6 shutout loss to Denver, Henry sank to 12th in the league in rushing, over 200 yards behind the league leaders he would eventually catch. Henry responded with 90 rushing yards and a touchdown in a 23–20 victory against the Los Angeles Chargers in Week 7. During Week 9 against the Carolina Panthers, Henry rushed 13 times for 63 yards and a touchdown and caught three passes for 36 yards and a touchdown in the 30–20 road loss. In the next game against the Kansas City Chiefs, he finished with 188 rushing yards and two touchdowns as the Titans narrowly won 35–32. Henry won the FedEx Ground Player of the Week for his efforts. During a Jaguars rematch in Week 12 after a Week 11 bye, Henry had a 74-yard rushing touchdown in the third quarter. Overall, he finished the 42–20 victory with 159 rushing yards and two touchdowns along with one reception for 16 yards. In the next game, a rematch against the Colts, he rushed 26 times for 149 yards and a touchdown in the 31–17 road victory. During Week 14 against the Oakland Raiders, Henry ran for 103 yards and two touchdowns in the 42–21 road victory. During the regular-season finale against the Houston Texans, Henry finished with 211 rushing yards and three touchdowns as the Titans won 35–14 and made it to the playoffs as a Wild Card team. During the game, Henry narrowly won the 2019 rushing title over Nick Chubb of the Cleveland Browns, with the winning rush being a 53-yard touchdown run. This was Henry's first career rushing crown and the first Titan to win it since Chris Johnson in 2009.

Henry finished the regular season setting career-highs in carries with 303, rushing yards with 1,540, and rushing touchdowns with 16, which all led the league, despite only playing in 15 games, missing the Week 16 game against the New Orleans Saints due to a hamstring injury. He also set career-highs in receptions with 16, receiving yards with 206, and receiving touchdowns with two.  On December 17, 2019, he was selected to his first Pro Bowl. On January 3, 2020, he was named to the second-team All-Pro at both the running back and flex position, both behind Christian McCaffrey.  He was ranked 10th by this fellow players on the NFL Top 100 Players of 2020.

With the Titans finishing the season 9–7, the team narrowly clinched a wild card spot for the #6 seed. In the Wild Card Round against the defending Super Bowl champion New England Patriots, which was played on his 26th birthday, Henry rushed for over 100 yards and a touchdown in the first half, finishing with 182 yards (the most ever against a Bill Belichick-led team, and the third most ever in a postseason road game) and a 22-yard reception in the 20–13 road victory. Henry became the first rushing champion with a 100-yard playoff game since Terrell Davis in 1998, the first to win a playoff game since LaDainian Tomlinson in 2007, and the second Titan with multiple post-season 100+ rushing games. He also broke his own franchise record for most yards-from-scrimmage with 204. During the Divisional Round against the Baltimore Ravens, Henry rushed 30 times for 195 yards and threw a three-yard touchdown pass to wide receiver Corey Davis in the 28–12 road victory. He became the second player in NFL history with three postseason games with at least 150 rushing yards, joining Terrell Davis, who had four. In addition, he became the only player with at least 175 rushing yards in consecutive games. Davis is the only other with two such games in a career.
In the AFC Championship against the Chiefs, Henry was mostly held in check. During the game, he rushed 19 times for 69 yards and a touchdown in the 35–24 road loss.

On March 16, 2020, the Titans placed the franchise tag on Henry. He signed the tag on April 2, 2020. Henry signed a new four-year $50 million contract with the team on July 15, 2020.

2020: Offensive Player of the Year

Despite leading the league in rushing yards for most of the first four weeks of the 2020 season, Henry was limited to no more than 3.7 yards per carry for all but one of them. These struggles ended in the week 6 game against the Houston Texans, Henry finished with 212 rushing yards, 52 receiving yards, and two touchdowns (including a 94-yard rushing touchdown). In overtime, he finished the game with a five-yard touchdown to end the game as the Titans won 42–36.
Henry was named the AFC Offensive Player of the Week for his performance in Week 6. He was also named AFC Offensive Player of the Month for October after racking up 399 scrimmage yards with 344 yards rushing and five touchdowns. During a Week 8 31–20 road loss to the Cincinnati Bengals, he ran for 112 yards and a touchdown. In Week 11 against the Baltimore Ravens, Henry had 133 rushing yards and the game-winning touchdown in overtime to defeat the Ravens on the road 30–24. In a 45–26 road victory against the Indianapolis Colts in Week 12, Henry had 27 carries for 178 rushing yards and three touchdowns. In Week 14 against the Jacksonville Jaguars, Henry rushed 26 times for 215 yards and two touchdowns during the 31–10 victory.
In Week 15 against the Detroit Lions, Henry rushed for 147 yards and a touchdown during the 46–25 win. 
In Week 17 against the Houston Texans, Henry rushed for a career-high 250 rushing yards and two touchdowns during the 41–38 road victory.
Henry was named the AFC Offensive Player of the Week for his performance.
During the game, Henry became the eighth running back in NFL history to surpass 2,000 rushing yards. This also made him the only player to have 2,000 yard rushing seasons in high school, college, and the NFL. In addition to his 2,027 rushing yards, Henry established career highs in carries (378), yards-per-carry (5.4) and rushing touchdowns (17). He was named the 2020 Offensive Player of the Year at the 10th Annual NFL Honors. He was ranked fourth by his fellow players on the NFL Top 100 Players of 2021.

In the Wild Card Round of the playoffs against the Ravens, Henry was held without a single first down. He was limited to 40 yards on 18 carries (2.2 yards-per-carry) and three receptions for 11 yards during the 20–13 loss.

2021: Injury-shortened season

Henry began the season slow, held to only 58 rushing yards as the Titans lost to the Arizona Cardinals 38–13. During Week 2 against the Seattle Seahawks, Henry finished with 182 rushing yards, 55 receiving yards, and three rushing touchdowns as the Titans won 33–30 in overtime. He earned AFC Offensive Player of the Week for Week 2. In Week 6, Henry ran for 143 yards and three touchdowns in a 34-31 win over the Bills, earning his second AFC Offensive Player of the Week honor of the year.

During a Week 8 win against the Indianapolis Colts, Henry suffered a Jones fracture that would end up sidelining him for the remainder of the regular season. He was placed on injured reserve on November 1. Prior to his injury, Henry was leading the league in carries, rushing yards and rushing touchdowns, and was on pace to break the NFL rushing record. Henry was named the Titans' nominee for the 2021 Walter Payton Man of the Year Award.

Henry was activated off injured reserve on January 21, 2022, for the team's Divisional Round game against the Cincinnati Bengals. In his return, Henry had 20 carries for 62 yards along with a rushing touchdown in the Titans' 19–16 loss. He was ranked 12th by his fellow players on the NFL Top 100 Players of 2022.

2022

In Week 3, against the Las Vegas Raiders, Henry had 143 scrimmage yards and a rushing touchdown in the 24–22 victory. In the following game, against the Indianapolis Colts, Henry had 22 carries for 114 rushing yards and a rushing touchdown in the 24–17 victory. One week later, he had 28 carries for 102 rushing yards and two rushing touchdowns in a 21–17 victory over the Washington Commanders. In Week 7, Henry had 30 carries for 128 rushing yards in a 19–10 victory over the Colts. In Week 8, Henry had 32 carries for 219 yards and two touchdowns in a 17–10 win over the Houston Texans, earning AFC Offensive Player of the Week. He was named AFC Offensive Player of the Month for October. In Week 9, against the Kansas City Chiefs, Henry had 17 carries for 115 rushing yards and two rushing touchdowns in the 20–17 overtime loss. In Week 11, against the Green Bay Packers, Henry had 132 scrimmage yards and one rushing touchdown. In addition, he threw a three-yard touchdown pass to Austin Hooper in the 27–17 victory. In Week 14, against the Jacksonville Jaguars, he had 155 scrimmage yards in the 36–22 loss. In the following week against the Los Angeles Chargers, Henry had 163 scrimmage yards and a rushing touchdown in the 17–14 loss. In Week 16, Henry had 23 carries for 126 rushing yards and a rushing touchdown in the 19–14 loss to the Houston Texans. With Week 17 having no bearing on the Titans' playoff hopes, Henry was rested for the Dallas Cowboys game. In the Week 18 winner-take-all game for the AFC South, Henry had 30 carries for 109 rushing yards in the 20–16 elimination loss to the Jacksonville Jaguars. In the 2022 season, Henry finished with 349 carries for 1,538 rushing yards and 13 rushing touchdowns to go along with 33 receptions for 398 receiving yards. He led the league in rushing attempts and finished second in rushing yards and rushing touchdowns. He was named to the Pro Bowl.

Playing style
At 6'3 and 247 lb, Henry is much larger than most running backs and has a frame comparable to that of a linebacker. Henry is a "power back", using his large size and strength to overpower defenders and break tackles. In 2020, he accumulated 1,073 yards after contact, over 300 yards more than any running back in the league, and led the league in broken tackles with 34. He couples that strength and size with surprising speed relative to his size. Henry is adept at using the stiff-arm to get away from defenders.  As a power back, Henry's playing style contrasts with those of smaller, so-called "scat backs", who have greater elusiveness due to their faster ability to change directions. Henry has never caught more than 20 passes a season, but he makes up for his lack of productiveness as a pass-catcher using his dominance as a pure runner.

Observers have also noted Henry has a tendency to get better, particularly in yards per carry, in the later stages of a game, as his strength and toughness wears down opponents. Henry's successful running game has also permitted the offense success with play-action.

NFL career statistics

Regular season

Postseason

Records

NFL records
 First player to record a 200+-yard and 4+-touchdown game on fewer than 22 carries
 Tied for longest run in NFL history at 99 yards (Tony Dorsett – 1982)
 First player in NFL history with 180+ rushing yards in three consecutive games
 Most rushing yards in first 4 playoff games: 561
 First player to have 180+ rushing yards in consecutive playoff games

Titans franchise records
 Most rushing yards in a game: 250 (January 3, 2021, against the Houston Texans)
 Most rushing yards in back-to-back games: 408
 Most rushing yards in a postseason game: 195 (January 11, 2020, at the Baltimore Ravens)
 Most rushing touchdowns in a game: 4 (December 6, 2018, against the Jacksonville Jaguars, tied with Earl Campbell 1978 and Lorenzo White 1990)
 Most scrimmage yards in a postseason game: 204 (January 11, 2020, at the Baltimore Ravens)
 Most 100+ rushing yard postseason games: 3
 Most games with at least two touchdowns in a season: 6 (2019, 2020; tied with Bill Groman and Chris Johnson)
 Longest rushing play: 99 yards
 Most rushing yards in a season: 2,027 yards

Awards and honors

NFL
 NFL Offensive Player of the Year (2020)
 First-team All-Pro (2020)
 Second-team All-Pro (2019)
 3× Pro Bowl (2019, 2020, 2022)
 2× NFL rushing yards leader (2019, 2020)
 2× NFL rushing touchdowns leader (2019, 2020)

College
 CFP National Champion (2015)
 Heisman Trophy (2015)
 Maxwell Award (2015)
 Doak Walker Award (2015)
 Walter Camp Award (2015)
 Unanimous All-American (2015)
 SEC Offensive Player of the Year (2015)
 First-team All-SEC (2015)

Personal life
Henry is a Christian. Henry has said, "I pray all the time. I'm always thankful for all my blessings that God has given to me, to me and my family. My grandmother always told me, 'Always keep God first. Always thank Him for everything in your life, good or bad.'"

In 2018, Henry fulfilled a promise to his grandmother Gladys and graduated from Alabama in May 2018 with a bachelor's degree in communications. He has a portrait tattoo of her on his chest.

In November 2019, Henry's hometown of Yulee, Florida, celebrated him with a welcome sign in his honor. Fundraising for the sign came from local residents and businesses who wanted to recognize the accomplishments of the rising football star.

Henry has been dating Adrianna Rivas since 2016. On May 18, 2020, Rivas gave birth to their daughter, Valentina Allure Henry.

Henry is the founder of the Two All Foundation. The organization "exists to level the playing field for today's youth so that their future success is not limited by the circumstances of their upbringing, background, disability, or influence."

References

External links

 
 Tennessee Titans bio
 Alabama Crimson Tide bio
 
 

1994 births
Living people
People from Yulee, Florida
African-American players of American football
Players of American football from Florida
American football running backs
Alabama Crimson Tide football players
All-American college football players
Heisman Trophy winners
Tennessee Titans players
21st-century African-American sportspeople
National Football League Offensive Player of the Year Award winners
American Conference Pro Bowl players